Have You Ever Heard The Lovely Eggs? EP is an EP by Lancaster-based band The Lovely Eggs. Released on October 20, 2008 throughout the UK, it was the band's first release on label Cherryade Records.

Track listing
"Have You Ever Heard a Digital Accordion?" – 2:17
"I Collect Snails" – 4:07
"I Want To Fall Off My Bike Today" – 4:55
"I Want To Be In Your Fire" – 5:12
"Weird Heart" – 5:12

References

External links
The Lovely Eggs' video for Have You Ever Heard A Digital Accordion? on YouTube

2008 EPs
The Lovely Eggs albums